Oxford Review of Economic Policy is a quarterly peer-reviewed academic journal of economics. Each issue concentrates on a current theme in economic policy, with a balance between macro- and microeconomics, and comprises an assessment and a number of articles.

See also 
 List of scholarly journals in economics

External links 
 

Economics journals
Publications established in 1985
Quarterly journals
Oxford University Press academic journals
English-language journals
1985 establishments in the United Kingdom